Pseudophoxinus elizavetae, also known as the Sultan Sazlığı minnow, is a species of freshwater fish in the family Cyprinidae. It is found in several springs and streams in Kayseri Province in Turkey.

References

Pseudophoxinus
Endemic fauna of Turkey
Fish described in 2006